Gönül is a Turkish name and may refer to:

Given name
 Gönül Yazar, Turkish singer
 Gönül Pultar, Turkish scholar and writer

Surname
 Gökhan Gönül, Turkish footballer
 Vecdi Gönül, Turkish politician

Turkish-language surnames
Turkish feminine given names